Devens is a surname. Notable people with the surname are as follows:

 Charles Devens (1820–1891), American lawyer, jurist, and statesman
 Charlie Devens (1910–2003), American baseball player
 Mary Devens (1857–1920), American photographer 
 Paul Devens (born 1965), Dutch contemporary artist
 Robert Devens (born 1972), American tennis player.
 Sarah Devens (1973–1995), American ice hockey player

Surnames of English origin